The Atherton ctenotus (Ctenotus monticola)  is a species of skink found in Queensland in Australia.

References

monticola
Reptiles described in 1981
Taxa named by Glen Milton Storr